Complex Sportif Hérémakono is a multi-use stadium in Bamako, Mali.  It is currently used mostly for football matches. It serves as a home ground of Djoliba AC. The stadium holds 5,000 people.

Football venues in Mali
Buildings and structures in Bamako
Djoliba AC